Pablo Iglesias Posse (17 October 1850 – 9 December 1925) was a Spanish socialist and Marxist labour leader. He is regarded as the father of Spanish socialism, having founded the Spanish Socialist Workers' Party (PSOE) in 1879 and the Spanish General Workers' Union (UGT) in 1888.

Biography
Iglesias was born in Ferrol son to Pedro Iglesias and Juana, humble parents who called him Paulino. He attended school between the ages of six and nine, when his father, a municipal laborer, died. Manuel, his younger brother, and their mother put their possessions in a small covered cart and walked with it to live in Madrid. Pablo's mother survived there by begging, and both boys entered the Hospicio of San Fernando. They completed primary schooling there, and Pablo learned printing. Aged twelve he left the Hospicio to work and to help support his mother. He worked as a printer, gradually improving his wages. While he was rendered unemployed by a strike, his brother died of tuberculosis.

He attended evening classes and learned French. This let him read classic works of French political science, translate the works of French socialists and participate successfully in international congresses. Protected by the 1869 Constitution, the Spanish section of the International Workingmen's Association (AIT) organized a series of conferences in Madrid. Iglesias attended, and in 1870, was invited to enter the printers section. The appearance of Solidarity, newspaper of the International, started him on the intense journalistic career that occupied the rest of his life.

Iglesias in 1873 applied to join the Association of Art Printers and the following year was chosen as its president. From this platform he began several years of secret work preparing to start the world's second workers party. On 22 May 1879, at a renowned clandestine banquet of international brotherhood in Madrid, twenty-five people (led by Iglesias) founded the Spanish Socialist Workers Party (PSOE - Partido Socialista Obrero Español).

Political activism repeatedly put Iglesias in jail, first in 1882 after a strike and the last time in 1910 when he was sixty. He always rejected offers of clemency, and as an ex-convict some employers would deny him work. More than once, only the newspaper The Socialist he had founded on 12 March 1886, and his wage as its printer, editor and director, kept him from starving.

On 12 August 1888 the Spanish General Workers Union (UGT) was founded in Barcelona, its name proposed by Iglesias.

The Congress of 1889 named him president of its national committee, a position he held for 36 years until his death. In 1890, when the day of struggle was celebrated for the first time in Madrid on 1 May, he headed an impressive demonstration. He led the representation to the Government of demands for legislative reforms, such as the 8-hour working day. In 1905 he first joined the City Council of Madrid.

Republicans had opposed Iglesias, but a Republican-Socialist alliance paved the way for the 1910 elections to make him the first socialist deputy in the Spanish Parliament. Worsening health prevented him attending many parliamentary sessions after 1914, limiting his parliamentary career. 1923 saw him elected a deputy for the last time.

Despite his sparse theoretical background, he produced many excellent intellectual works in Spain and internationally. He published more than two thousand newspaper articles in Spain between his first, The War, on 5 December 1870 in Solidarity, and the last, The Working Class Will Win in Freedom on 5 December 1925.

Iglesias was one of the best propagandists among Spanish socialist idealists; few workers' leaders wrote so much of interest. Characterised by vehement defense and furious attack, his works make an ethically coherent call for regeneration and hope.

On his death, an office drawer contained a parting gift of 1,000 pesetas from Iglesias for The Socialist, to which he had been linked from its birth. There were widespread posthumous tributes to him. With Government authorization, more than 150,000 workers accompanied his funeral procession to the civil cemetery in Madrid.

The Spanish liberal philosopher José Ortega y Gasset praised him as a "secular saint".  In For Whom the Bell Tolls, Ernest Hemingway wrote, "God pity the Spanish people.  Any leader they have will muck them.  One good man, Pablo Iglesias, in two thousand years...." (Chapt. 35).

Further reading

References

External links
Pablo Iglesias Foundation

1850 births
1925 deaths
Politicians from Galicia (Spain)
Leaders of political parties in Spain
Members of the Congress of Deputies of the Spanish Restoration
People from Ferrol, Spain
Spanish political party founders
Spanish printers
Spanish Socialist Workers' Party politicians
Spanish trade union leaders
Unión General de Trabajadores members
Madrid city councillors
Spanish newspaper founders